Lulu Pinkus is an Australian screenwriter, producer, stage, film and television actress. She made appearances on numerous television crime and police dramas during the 1970s and early 80s, including a nine episode stint on Prisoner, as well as supporting roles in a number of feature films. She was also the wife of Yahoo Serious and has been involved in producing all of his films: Young Einstein, Reckless Kelly and Mr. Accident. Pinkus is also an accomplished artist having been featured in several art exhibitions.

Career
Pinkus made her television acting debut in 1975 with guest spots on Division 4 and Homicide, making a second appearance on the latter series 
a year later. She also appeared in the television miniseries Against the Wind, Cop Shop and Chopper Squad in 1978. She also performed with the Australian Performing Group at the Pram Factory. Following this came her first major role, a storyline spanning 11 episodes (of which she appears in 9) in the cult soap opera Prisoner playing Melinda Cross. Melinda, a university friend of Karen Travers (Peta Toppano), is arrested when she attempts to blackmail a married university lecturer with whom she had been having an affair.

She made her feature film debut that same year in the post-apocalyptic film Mad Max (1979), one of several Prisoner cast members to appear in the film. Her brief role was as the Nightrider's punky girlfriend. She also had supporting roles in the thrillers Thirst (1979) and Snapshot (1979). She continued working in television starring in the miniseries The Last Outlaw (1980), the television movie Intimate Strangers (1981) and guest starred on Bellamy and A Country Practice between 1981 and 1982. Her last role was in the film A Slice of Life (1983).

She was the associate producer of Young Einstein (1988), in which she made a cameo appearance, and married Yahoo Serious on 22 January 1989. Following her marriage to Serious, she became involved in all his later film projects. She wrote and co-produced, as Lulu Serious, Reckless Kelly (1993) and Mr. Accident (2000). She was also the film's music coordinator and casting director. In May 2007, it was reported that Pinkus and Serious had separated. In February 2008, she appeared at an art exhibition in New South Wales. Her collection was considered unconventional combining pop culture "with religious imagery & fairy tale motifs".

References

External links

Year of birth missing (living people)
Living people
Australian film actresses
Australian soap opera actresses
Australian stage actresses
Australian women painters
20th-century Australian actresses
21st-century Australian actresses